Antilhue I Power Plant is an oil-fueled electrical generating station in Antilhue, Los Ríos Region, Chile. The plant uses diesel as fuel and produces 50.9 MW of electricity. The plant was built in 2005 and is run by Colbún S.A.

References

Energy infrastructure in Los Ríos Region
Oil-fired power stations in Chile